The women's 500 metres race of the 2012 World Single Distance Speed Skating Championships was held on 25 March.

Results

References

2012 World Single Distance Speed Skating Championships
World